Marcelo Ríos defeated Greg Rusedski in the final, 6–3, 6–7(15–17), 7–6(7–4), 6–4 to win the men's singles tennis title at the 1998 Indian Wells Masters.

Michael Chang was the two-time reigning champion, but had to withdraw from the tournament after he suffered a knee injury. This injury occurred after a bizarre incident where sprinklers had accidentally sprayed water onto the court that Chang was practising on, causing Chang to slip and tear his left knee.

Seeds
The top eight seeds received a bye into the second round.

Draw

Finals

Top half

Section 1

Section 2

Bottom half

Section 3

Section 4

Qualifying

Seeds

Qualifiers

Lucky loser
  Nicolás Lapentti

Qualifying draw

First qualifier

Second qualifier

Third qualifier

Fourth qualifier

Fifth qualifier

Sixth qualifier

Seventh qualifier

References
 Official results archive (ATP)
 Official results archive (ITF)

Newsweek Champions Cup
1998 Newsweek Champions Cup and the State Farm Evert Cup